Jestha  ( jyeṣṭh)  is the second month in Bikram Samwat, the official Nepali calendar. This month starts with May 15 to 14 June of the Western calendar and is 30 days long. The Bikram Sambat originated from the Jonish Samwat.

This month was initially identical to second of Indian calendar month Jyeshta or Bengali calendar month Joishtho, however, due to regional pronunciation it differed later. The name is derived from the Bikram Sambat calendar

Months in Nepali calendar

See also
Vikram Samvat
Baisakh

Nepali calendar